"When You Talk About Love" is a song recorded by American singer and actress Patti LaBelle. It was written by Ann Nesby, James Harris III, Terry Lewis, and James "Big Jim" Wright for her thirteenth studio album, Flame (1997). Production was helmed by Harris and Lewis, with Wright credited as co-producer. Released as the album's lead single, it became one of the LaBelle's most popular hit singles in the 1990s, reaching number 56 on the US Billboard Hot 100 and number 12 on the Billboard Hot R&B/Hip-Hop Songs chart. A dance remix of the song helped to bring the song to number-one on the Billboard Hot Dance Club Songs chart, making it the fourth number-one dance single in LaBelle's career. The accompanying music video featured LaBelle playing a teacher giving a "class" about love.

Critical reception
Barry Walters for The Advocate noted, "Remixer Hex Hector saves LaBelle from the usual R&B radio cheese, and the result is Miss Thing's first proper club hit since — whew! — “New Attitude”." Larry Flick from Billboard wrote, "No one serves diva drama quite like Miss Patti. Her new album, Flame, is ushered in with an irresistible, funk-fortified slice o' soul. Producers Jimmy Jam, Terry Lewis, and Big Jim Wright have created a track that is intelligent enough to please the artist's mature listeners while kicking a beat that's tough enough to lure the kiddies. By the end of the first chorus, you'll be doing a little shoulder-shakin' shimmy, wailing along to LaBelle's "my name is love" rants. R&B programmers need to care about this single—in fact, so do top 40 tastemakers."

Track listings

Charts

References

1997 singles
Patti LaBelle songs
Songs written by Jimmy Jam and Terry Lewis
Song recordings produced by Jimmy Jam and Terry Lewis
MCA Records singles
1997 songs
Songs written by Ann Nesby
Dance-pop songs